The Gel'fand–Raikov (Гельфанд–Райков) theorem is a theorem in the theory of locally compact topological groups. It states that a locally compact group is completely determined by its  (possibly infinite dimensional) unitary representations. The theorem was first published in 1943.

. 
The set of all matrix coefficientsts for all unitary representations is closed under scalar multiplication (because we can replace ), addition 
(because of direct sum representations), multiplication (because of tensor representations) and complex conjugation (because of the complex conjugate representations). 

The matrix elements thus separate points, and it then follows from the Stone–Weierstrass theorem that on every compact subset of the group, the matrix elements are dense in the space of continuous functions, which determine the group completely.

See also
 Gelfand–Naimark theorem
 Representation theory

References

Representation theory of groups